William Henry Brockenbrough (February 23, 1812 – January 28, 1850) was a U.S. Representative from Florida from 1846 to 1847, and a United States District attorney from 1841 to 1843. He served in the Legislative Council of the Territory of Florida representing Mosquito County in 1838, 1841, and in 1842 as its president.

Born in Virginia, Brockenbrough studied law, was admitted to the bar and settled in Tallahassee, Florida. In 1837 he became a member of the Legislative Council of the Territory of Florida sitting as president in 1842. He became a United States district attorney 1841–1843; upon the admission of Florida as a State into the Union successfully contested as a Democrat the election of Edward C. Cabell to the Twenty-ninth United States Congress and served from January 24, 1846, to March 3, 1847; died in Tallahassee, Florida, interred in Episcopal Cemetery.

References 

1812 births
1850 deaths
Florida Democrats
Members of the United States House of Representatives from Florida
Florida state senators
Members of the Florida Territorial Legislature
People from Tallahassee, Florida
United States Attorneys
Florida Whigs
Democratic Party members of the United States House of Representatives
Brockenbrough family of Virginia
19th-century American politicians